Orphan's Day is a national day in Egypt, celebrated on the first Friday of April, since 2004.  It was founded by Dar Al-Orman, Egypt's largest charitable organization.

References

2004 establishments in Egypt
Annual events in Egypt
Spring (season) events in Egypt